Nizar or  Nezar or Nezzar or Nazar may refer to:

Ancient and medieval people
Nizar ibn Ma'ad, ancestor of Muhammad and most of the Adnanite tribes
Abu Mansur Nizar al-Aziz Billah (955–996), fifth Caliph of the Fatimid Caliphate
Nizar ibn al-Mustansir (died 1095) Fatimid prince and claimant caliph in 1095

Modern people

Surname
Hamid Nizar (born 1988), Sudanese footballer
Jamo Nezzar (born 1966), Algerian bodybuilder
Khaled Nezzar (born 1937), Algerian general
Lotfi Nezzar, Algerian businessman
Salman Nizar (born 1997), Indian cricketer
Yazin Nizar (born 1990), Indian playback singer

Given name
Nizar Al-Adsani, Kuwaiti business man
Nazar Al Baharna (born 1950), Bahraini politician
Nezar AlSayyad (born 1956), Egyptian-American architect
Nizar Assaad (born 1948), Syrian-born Canadian construction engineer
Nizar Baraka (born 1964), Moroccan politician
Nizar Chaari (born 1977), Tunisian radio and television presenter and producer
Nizar Dramsy, Malagasy politician
Nizar Hamdoon (1944–2003), Iraqi politician and diplomat
Nezar Hindawi (born 1954), Jordanian convicted of attempting to place a bomb on a plane
Mohammad Nizar Jamaluddin (born 1957), Menteri Besar (MB) of the Malaysian state of Perak
Nizar Khalfan (born 1988), Tanzanian footballer
Nizar Knioua (born 1983), Tunisian basketball player
Nizar Madani (born 1941), Saudi politician
Nizar Mahrous (born 1963), Syrian football player
Nizar Ben Nasra (born 1987), Tunisian-Austrian football forward 
Nizar Nayyouf (born 1962), Syrian journalist
Nizar Niyas (born 1990), Indian first-class cricket player
Nizar Qabbani (1923–1998), Syrian diplomat, poet and publisher
Nizar Rayan (1959–2009), Palestinian Hamas leader
Nizar Sassi (born 1979), Frenchman detained in Guantanamo
Yousif Nizar Saleh (born 1994), Kuwaiti squash player
Nizar Samlal (born 1979), Moroccan canoeman
Nizar Shafi (born 1989), Indian cinematographer
Nizar Trabelsi (born 1970), Tunisian football player
Nizar Wattad, Palestinian/American rapper
Mohd Nizar Zakaria (born 1969), Malaysian politician
Nizar Zakka, Lebanese information technology expert

Places
Gamishli Nazar, village in Iran
Nizar, Iran, a village in Kohgiluyeh and Boyer-Ahmad Province, Iran
Nezar, Iran, a village in Kurdistan Province, Iran
Nijhar, sometimes written as Nizar, tehsil in Tapi district in Gujarat, India